The 2006 FIBA Africa Under-18 Championship was the 15th U-18 FIBA Africa championship, played under the auspices of the Fédération Internationale de Basketball, the world basketball sport governing body. The tournament was held from July 28 to August 6, 2006 in Durban, South Africa, contested by 9 national teams and won by Nigeria.

The tournament qualified the winner and the runner-up for the 2007 FIBA Under-19 World Championship.

Format
The 12 teams were divided into two groups (Groups A+B) for the preliminary round.
Round robin for the preliminary round; the top four teams from each group advanced to the quarterfinals.
From there on a knockout system was used until the final.

Squads

Draw

Preliminary round

Group A

Group B

Knockout stage 
Championship bracket

7th place match

5th place match

Semifinals

Bronze medal game

Gold medal game

Final standings

Nigeria rosterAbel Baraya, Ahmed Ayodele, Daniel Daudu, Faruk Oyalade, Franck Eze, George Ehiagwina, Ibrahim Yusuf, Mbaram Omori, Nosa Omorogbe, Oluwaseyi Ayodele, Orseer Ikyaator, Solomon Alabi, Coach: Adeka Dauda

Statistical Leaders

Awards

All-Tournament Team

References

External links
Official website

2006
2006 in African basketball
2006 in women's basketball
2006 in South African sport
International basketball competitions hosted by South Africa